Pascimāmnāya Śrī Śāradā Pītham or Dwarka Sharada Math, is one amongst the five cardinal peethams established by the saint Adi Shankara to preserve and propagate Sanatana Dharma and Advaita Vedanta, the doctrine of non-dualism. Located in the city of Dwaraka, Gujarat, India it is the pascimāmnāya matha, or Western Āmnāya Pītham amongst the four Chaturāmnāya Pīthams, with the others being the Sringeri Śāradā pīṭhaṃ (Karnataka) in the South, Purī Govardhanmaṭha Pīṭhaṃ (Odisha) in the East, Badari Jyotirmaṭha Pīṭhaṃ (Uttarakhand) in the North and the Sarvagnya Pītham being Kanchi Kamakoti Pīṭham in the South (Tamil Nadu). It is also known as the Kālikā Matha. Their Vedantic mantra or Mahavakya is Tattvamasi (That thou art) and as per the tradition initiated by Adi Shankara it holds authority over Sama Veda. The head of the matha is called Shankarayacharya, the title derives from Adi Shankara.

History
 Shri Trivikrama Tirtha was the head of the monastery until 1921 when he was succeeded by Sri Bharati Krishna Tirtha.
 Shri Bharati was invited to lead the Puri matha in 1925 after the position had become vacant.
 Shri Bharati was succeeded by Shri Swarupananda.

1945 - Present
In 1945, Shri Abhinava Saccidananda Tirtha was nominated to the position. Before assuming his position at Dvaraka, Abhinava was the head of the Mulabagal matha in Karnataka, which was the 17th century branch of the Dvaraka matha. As a result, the cumulative lineage of Mulabagal matha was merged with Dvaraka when Abhinava took office there. Years later Shri Saccidananda helped to mediate the Shankarcharya successions at Puri and Jyotir Math.
Since Abhinava died in 1982, this peeth has been led by Swami Swarūpānanda Saraswatī who is one of the claimants to the position of Shankaracharya of the northern matha called Jyotish Pitha or Jyotir Math.

After the death of Swami Swaroopanand Saraswati, who was the Shankracharya of Dwarka Sharad Math, Swami Sadanand Saraswati was made the Shankaracharya of Dwarka Sharada Math.

Notes

See also
 Adi Shankara           
 Shankaracharya         
Kalady, Kerala - the holy birthplace of Jagadguru Adi Shankaracharya
Govardhan Math Peetham (East), Puri, Orissa                                     
Jyotir Badrikashram Peetham (North), Joshimath, Uttarakhand                                    
Shri Sringeri Sharada Peetham (South), Sringeri, Karnataka                 
Shri Kanchi Kamakoti Peetham, Kancheepuram, Tamil Nadu

References

Sources

 
 

Hindu organisations based in India
Shankaracharya mathas in India
Hinduism in Gujarat
Adi Shankara
8th-century establishments in India
Dwarka